Armin Reichel (born 31 January 1958 in Glan-Münchweiler) is a former professional German football goalkeeper.

Reichel started his professional career with 1. FC Kaiserslautern in the Bundesliga, where he made 63 first-team appearances. After spells with Tennis Borussia Berlin and 1. FC Saarbrücken in the 2. Bundesliga, Reichel moved to Wormatia Worms, where he spent a decade and played in 271 league games. He didn't retire until the age of 51, after having played for TuS Altleiningen in the Landesliga.

References

External links 
 

1958 births
Living people
People from Kusel (district)
German footballers
Association football goalkeepers
Bundesliga players
2. Bundesliga players
1. FC Kaiserslautern players
Tennis Borussia Berlin players
1. FC Saarbrücken players
Wormatia Worms players
German football managers
Footballers from Rhineland-Palatinate